The 2015 Wartburg Knights football team represented Wartburg College as a member of the Iowa Intercollegiate Athletic Conference (IIAC) during the 2015 NCAA Division III football season. Led by Rick Willis in his 17th season as head coach, the Knights compiled an overall record of 9–1 with a mark of 6–1 in conference play, finishing second and missing a chance at a third straight bid to the NCAA Division III Football Championship playoffs. The team played home games at Walston-Hoover Stadium in Waverly, Iowa.

Schedule
Wartburg's 2015 regular season scheduled consisted of six home and four away games.

References

Wartburg
Wartburg Knights football seasons
Wartburg Knights football